Sui Northern Gas Pipelines Limited (SNGPL) was incorporated as a private limited Company in 1963 and later converted into a public limited company in January 1964 under the Companies Act 1913 of British India, now The Companies Act 2017 of Pakistan, and is listed on the Pakistan Stock Exchange. 

SNGPL is the largest integrated gas company serving more than 7.22 million consumers in North Central Pakistan through an extensive network in Punjab, Khyber Pakhtunkhwa and Azad Jammu & Kashmir.

Main Transmissions regions of SNGPL are Faisalabad, Lahore, Multan, and Wah. The maximum diameter used in transmission Pipelines is round about 42 inches. Company has 16 distribution regions. 

SNGPL takes gas in 2 ways. The first one is 'System Gas' and the second is 'RLNG'. In the case of System Gas, the gas obtained from local resources is about 750-800 mmcd. While in the case of RLNG (Re-gasified Liquified Natural gas), we import gas from foreign countries in the form of liquid in a closed container. Then we re-gasify it and convert this liquid into gas. Its quantity is about 100 mmcd. 

Multan and Rawalpindi.

Registrations 

Company Registration Number: CUIN-0043761

National Tax Number(NTN): 0801137-7

Unaccounted for Gas (UfG)
The Unaccounted for Gas (UfG) of Sui Northern Gas Pipelines Limited (SNGPL) is growing exponentially. The UfG has increased to 11.9 percent of SSGC in financial year 2020-21. The permissible limit of UfG is seven percent

See also 

 Sui gas field
 Sui Southern Gas Company
 KSE 100 Index

References

External links
 Official Sui Northern Gas Pipelines Limited website

Oil and gas companies of Pakistan
Natural gas pipeline companies
Natural gas companies
Companies based in Lahore
Non-renewable resource companies established in 1963
Pakistani companies established in 1963
Companies listed on the Pakistan Stock Exchange
Pakistani brands